is a former Japanese football player.

Playing career
Saga was born in Sapporo on May 20, 1980. After graduating from high school, he joined J2 League club Consadole Sapporo based in his local in 1999. Although he played several matches, he could not play many matches until 2000. In 2001, he moved to J2 club Montedio Yamagata. In 2001, he played many matches as substitute midfielder. However his opportunity to play decreased in 2002. In 2003, he moved to Regional Leagues club Okinawa Kariyushi FC. He retired end of 2004 season.

Club statistics

External links

1980 births
Living people
Association football people from Hokkaido
Japanese footballers
J2 League players
Hokkaido Consadole Sapporo players
Montedio Yamagata players
Association football midfielders
Sportspeople from Sapporo